Karl August Larsson (10 June 1906 – 31 May 1971) was a Swedish sports shooter. He competed at the 1932 Summer Olympics and 1936 Summer Olympics.

References

1906 births
1971 deaths
Swedish male sport shooters
Olympic shooters of Sweden
Shooters at the 1932 Summer Olympics
Shooters at the 1936 Summer Olympics
Sport shooters from Stockholm